(Thomas Richard) Burnham Hodgson (17 August 1926 - 30 September 2020) was Archdeacon of West Cumberland from 1979 until 1991.

Hodgson was educated at Heversham Grammar School and the London College of Divinity; and ordained in 1953. He held curacies at Keswick and Stanwix and incumbencies in Whitehaven, Aikton, Raughton Head  and Grange-over-Sands. Hodgson was a member of the General Synod of the Church of England from 1983 until 1990.

References

1926 births
People educated at Heversham Grammar School
Alumni of the London College of Divinity
Archdeacons of West Cumberland
2020 deaths